The Highlands School was an independent primary school in Reading, Berkshire, England.  For most of its history the school was located in Wardle Avenue, Tilehurst. Highlands admitted both boys and girls in the lower years, but the upper forms were girls only.

The school was founded in 1929 and closed in July 2011.

Notable former pupils

Notable former pupils include Mike Oldfield, Minette Walters and Tracy Edwards.

External links 
 School website
 The main school building, July 2011
 Entry on findmyschool website

Notes 

Defunct schools in Reading, Berkshire
Educational institutions established in 1929
Educational institutions disestablished in 2011
1929 establishments in England
2011 disestablishments in England